Lyric was an American R&B girl group, which comprised Brooklyn native, Farrah "Fendi" Fleurimond, Los Angeles native Jackie (a.k.a. Baby J), and Detroit native Thema "Tayma Loren" McKinney. They would later be recognized as the first female trio to be signed by Clive Davis to his J Records imprint.

Background
The group recorded a self-titled debut album that was scheduled to be released in November 5, 2002. The album was set to feature production from Hennessy, Kenny Whitehead, Steve Estiverne, Jack Knight and Thema's brother Carlos "Pryceless" McKinney. The debut yielded four singles ("Young & Sexy", "Episode", "Hot & Tipsy" and "Little Did You Know") before its cancellation.

In 2003, the trio attended the Grammy Week Songwriters luncheon with Patti LaBelle, before their disbandment and exit from J Records.

Discography

Singles

References

External links
 
 Lyric at MTV.com
 Lyric at Last.fm

American girl groups
American contemporary R&B musical groups
African-American musical groups
J Records artists
American musical trios